¥€$ is the second album by Estonian rapper, singer and conceptual artist Tommy Cash. It was released on November 30, 2018. The album was preceded by the single "X-Ray" and features collaborations with Rick Owens and MC Bin Laden.

Singles
"X-Ray" was the only single released from the album. Produced by A. G. Cook and Danny L Harle, it was unveiled a week before the album on November 22, 2018. Its music video was self-directed along Anna-Lisa Himma and features Cash as cult leader. It has been compared to the film The Holy Mountain. Cook and Russian model Sasha Trautvein also made a cameo.

Reception

Laura Copley from Clash described the album as "a complete sensory overload", also praising the tracks "Brazil" and "Cool 3D World". The latter was named "[it]’s strongest offering." She ranked the album with 4 points out of 5, naming "Vegetarian" the weakest track. Bianca Guilione from Highsnobiety aided the album's production, noticing the incorporation of "nostalgia-inducing" electronic sub-genres and describing Boys Noize's work as "blown-out bass bliss". The publication gave the album a rating of 4.5 points out of 5. For Jenesaispop, Jordi Bardají criticized the use of awful phrases, comparing its lyricism to a more innocent version of Cupcakke while also suggesting its sound could be what Lady Gaga's then-upcoming record Chromatica was going to offer. Highlighting the songs "Brazil", "Horse B4 Porsche", "Mona Lisa" and the single "X-Ray", the album got a 7 out of 10 qualification. The author dubbed Cash as a necessary political subject on the music landscape.

Track listing

Notes

 signifies an additional producer
All songs are stylised in uppercase letters.
 "X-Ray" features additional vocals from Caroline Polachek.
 "Cool 3D World" features additional vocals from Charli XCX and Hannah Diamond.

Sample credits
 "Horse B4 Porsche" contains a sample of "Mood" as performed by Carlie Hanson, written by Hanson, Leland and Cook.
 "Dostoyevsky" contains a sample of "Full Circle" as performed and written by Easyfun.

References

2018 albums
Albums produced by A. G. Cook
Albums produced by Boys Noize
PC Music albums
Albums produced by Danny L Harle